Skrill (formerly Moneybookers) is a digital wallet provider established in 2001 which offers a multiple online payment and money transfer services.

Skrill operates in 131 countries with the digital wallet offered in 40 currencies. Customers can transfer money to their Skrill wallet using multiple payment options which include by card, bank transfer, and others. The funds can then be used to pay merchant and users that accepts payments via Skrill or turned into cryptocurrency.

Skrill also has cross-border payments accessible to customers via its remittance service. The service enables customers to send money to a bank account overseas using their bank card.

In 2015, Skrill was acquired by the Paysafe Group  along with former competitor Neteller and prepaid payment provider paysafecard.

Skrill is operated by Paysafe Payment Solutions Limited, a company incorporated in Ireland and regulated by the Central Bank of Ireland, for its European regulated activities. Skrill's activities outside the European Economic Area are operated by Skrill Limited – a company incorporated in the United Kingdom and regulated by the Financial Conduct Authority.

History

Early history (2001 to 2015) 

Skrill was originally founded in 2001 in the United Kingdom as Moneybookers, a digital wallet provider. By 2007 it had become established as one of the top three e-payment solution providers in Europe when it was purchased by Investcorp in March of that year. In August 2010, Skrill blocked the account operated by WikiLeaks as a donation collection account, citing the organisation's addition to Australian blacklists and American watchlists. In September 2011, Moneybookers announced that they would rebrand their service as Skrill, completing the rebrand in 2013. As Skrill, they completed the acquisition of Austrian-based prepaid payment method paysafecard in February 2013, before being acquired by CVC Capital Partners for €600 million in August 2013.

Paysafe subsidiary (2015 onwards) 

In 2015, Skrill was acquired by Optimal Payments, the parent company of rival digital wallet Neteller, for €1.1 billion. During this period, Skrill Group announced in April 2015 that it had completed acquisition of Ukash, a UK-based competitor of paysafecard, which was merged during the same year. In November 2015, Optimal Payments rebranded as Paysafe.

In 2018, Skrill began to extend the amount of services offered to its customers, launching an international money transfer service in February 2018, and a crypto service in July 2018 allowing users to buy and trade cryptocurrencies. This was followed by the launch of Skrill's customer loyalty programme, KNECT, in November 2019 and the extension of the international money transfer service to US customers in June 2020.

Sponsorship and relationships 

In 2011, Skrill first sponsored the PokerStars owned European Poker Tour for its eighth season, sponsoring the event again in 2013 for its tenth season.

In July 2013, English football's National League signed a one-year sponsorship deal with Skrill with the Conference's divisions being known as The Skrill Premier, The Skrill North and The Skrill South.

In May 2020, Skrill announced a four-year AC Milan sponsorship deal.

In March 2021, Skrill announced a new partnership with the English Premier League football team Leeds United.

Service
Skrill is a digital multi-currency wallet provider for handling online payments, making transfers and storing money. Skrill can also be used to buy and trade cryptocurrency. Customers in certain locations can obtain a Skrill Card linked to their account.

Awards
Skrill was named Best Digital Wallet in 2019 by Juniper Research at their Future Digital Awards.

Paysafe, Skrill's parent company, received the Payments Processor of the Year award at the 2019 American Gambling Awards for the Skrill digital wallet and sister product Paysafecard.

In 2019 Paysafe won the ‘Best Online Payments Solution – Consumer’ at the Payments Awards. The accolade recognised Paysafe's suite of online consumer payment methods, including its digital wallets Skrill and Neteller.

References

External links 
 
 

Digital currencies
Electronic funds transfer
Payment service providers
Online gambling
Companies based in the London Borough of Tower Hamlets
Foreign exchange companies
Financial services companies established in 2001
2015 mergers and acquisitions